Culter alburnus, the topmouth culter, is an East Asian species of freshwater ray-finned fish in the cyprinid genus Culter.

Geographic distribution and habitat
Culter alburnus occurs in Lake Buir, the Onon and Kherlen drainages in Mongolia, as well as the Amur and Red River drainages in Far East Russia and China, it has also been recorded from Taiwan and Hainan. It can be found in rivers and floodplain lakes which have dense growth of macrophytes.

Footnotes

References

Culter (fish)
Fish described in 1855